David Rytz von Brugg (1 April 1801, in Bucheggberg – 25 March 1868, in Aarau) was a  Swiss mathematician and teacher.

Life 
Rytz von Brugg was son of a  priest and studied mathematics at Göttingen and Leipzig. He had teaching positions at various cities, one of them 1835 until 1862 at Aarau, where he was „Professor der Mathematik an der Gewerbeschule zu Aarau“.

Merits 
Rytz von Brugg is famous for a geometrical method which is known as Rytz’s axis construction. This classical procedure retrieves the semi-axes of an Ellipse from any pair of conjugate diameters. This method is known since 1845, when it was published within a paper by Leopold Moosbrugger.

Sources 
  MR1089881
 
 
  MR2918594

References 

1801 births
1868 deaths
Swiss mathematicians